Greatest Video Hits is a 1992 compilation of promotional videos from progressive rock group Yes. It contains the majority of MTV videos filmed by the band, as well as a few early promotional videos that pre-date MTV. It contains videos from 1977's Going for the One through 1987's Big Generator.

In between videos, band members are interviewed backstage in the Pensacola Civic Center before a concert on the 1991 Union tour. These were from the same interview sessions that were used in the Yesyears video. The video was released on VHS in 1992 and re-released on DVD in 2005.

Track listing
"Wonderous Stories"
"Don't Kill the Whale"
"Madrigal"
"Tempus Fugit"
"Into the Lens"
"Hold On" (live)
"Leave It"
"It Can Happen"
"Owner of a Lonely Heart"
"Rhythm of Love"
"Love Will Find a Way"
"I've Seen All Good People" (live)

Yes (band) video albums
Music video compilation albums
1992 video albums
1992 compilation albums